Tord Pedersen (August 11, 1857 – December 8, 1926) was a Norwegian teacher and historian.

Pedersen served as the head of the Drammen Latin School. He was the uncle of Haakon Shetelig.

Awards and recognitions
 Knight of the Order of St. Olav, 1911
 Fridtjof Nansen Prize for Outstanding Research, 1922, for his work on the history of Drammen
 Member of the Norwegian Academy of Science and Letters, 1922

Bibliography
 Drammen: en norsk østlandsbys utviklingshistorie: avhandlinger og skildringer (Drammen: The Development History of an East Norwegian Town: Essays and Descriptions). 2 vols. Drammen: Harald Lyche, 1912, 1921

References

1857 births
1926 deaths
20th-century Norwegian historians
Heads of schools in Norway
Members of the Norwegian Academy of Science and Letters